Bedros IV Sarajian   (1870 – 28 September 1940, Beirut) was Catholicos of Cilicia of the Armenian Apostolic Church for only six months during 1940.  After his death, the position remained vacant until 1943 when Karekin I of Cilicia was elected.

Bedros had been Armenian Prelate of Cyprus (1899–1905 and 1921–1940) and Armenian Prelate of Hadjin (1910–1915), before becoming Co-Adjutor Catholicos of Cilicia (1936–1940) and eventually was elected as Catholicos in 1940.

Source: Avakian, Arra S. (1998). Armenia: A Journey Through History. The Electric Press, Fresno.

Catholicoi of Cilicia
1870 births
1940 deaths
Armenian Oriental Orthodox Christians
Armenian Apostolic Church in Cyprus